The Indian Creek Covered Bridge is a historic covered bridge near US 219, about 4 miles away from Salt Sulphur Springs, in Monroe County, West Virginia, United States. It is owned by the Monroe County Historical Society, and was originally built in 1898 by Ray and Oscar Weikel. The bridge is 49.25 feet long and 11.5 feet wide.

It was listed on the National Register of Historic Places in 1975.

The bridge was restored by Hoke Brothers Construction, Inc. of Union, West Virginia in 2000 at a cost of $334,446. It is open to pedestrians, and said to be one of the most photographed bridges in West Virginia.

References

External links
Monroe County Historical Society

See also
List of West Virginia covered bridges

Covered bridges on the National Register of Historic Places in West Virginia
Buildings and structures in Monroe County, West Virginia
Tourist attractions in Monroe County, West Virginia
Transportation in Monroe County, West Virginia
National Register of Historic Places in Monroe County, West Virginia
Bridges completed in 1898
Road bridges on the National Register of Historic Places in West Virginia
Wooden bridges in West Virginia
Howe truss bridges in the United States